This is a list of seasons of Malmö, Sweden-based ice hockey club, IF Malmö Redhawks, previously known as Malmö IF and MIF Redhawks.

Note: GP = Games played, W = Wins, L = Losses, T = Ties, Pts = Points, GF = Goals for, GA = Goals against

References